FC Skuri, occasionally also spelled as Squri, is a Georgian football club, based in the town of Tsalenjikha. Currently they compete in Liga 4, the fourth tier of Georgian league system.

History
During the late Soviet times Skuri was mainly a member of the first division of Georgian domestic league. After 1990s the team for years competed in Pirveli Liga, the second division of national championship. 

Skuri suffered a defeat in the 2014-15 fierce survival battle, although still obtained the right to remain in the league after another club was expelled. In 2016, they were defeated in the play-off final and relegated to the third league. 

A year later Skuri lost another relegation play-off tie and, as a result, had to quit Liga 3 as well. 

Having played for next two seasons in Regionuli Liga, the club gained promotion to the newly formed Liga 4 for the 2020 season after winning the first phase of the competition and coming 3rd in the Promotion Group.

Squad
As of April 2022

(C)

Seasons

Name
Skuri is a balneological resort located in Tsalenjikha municipality.

References

External links
Profile on Soccerway

Official Facebook page

Football clubs in Georgia (country)